Gustav Falke (11 January 1853 – 8 February 1916) was a German writer.

Life 
Falke was born in Lübeck to merchant Johann Friedrich Christian Falke and his wife Elisabeth Franziska Hoyer.

He worked in a bookstore in Hamburg from 1868, then moved to Essen, Stuttgart, and Hildburghausen. He returned to Hamburg in 1878, where he was educated in music by Emil Krause, to become a piano teacher. In 1888 he married his former piano student Anna Theen. They had two daughters and a son.

Much of his work was impressionistic lyric poetry inspired by Liliencron, Richard Dehmel, and Paul Heyse. He also wrote conservative, "folk" pieces, following Eduard Mörike and Theodor Storm, and children's books in rhyme and prose. With the advent of World War I, he volunteered to write war propaganda as well, for which he was awarded the Prussian Roter Adlerorden. Composers such as Pauline Volkstein set Falke’s texts to music.

Falke died in Hamburg.

Works 

 Aus dem Durchschnitt, Berlin 1892
 Mynheer der Tod und andere Gedichte, Dresden u.a. 1892
 Tanz und Andacht, München 1893
 Harmlose Humoresken, München 1894
 Der Kuß, München 1894
 Zwischen zwei Nächten, Stuttgart 1894
 Landen und Stranden, Berlin
 1. Hamburger Kinder, 1895
 2. Neben der Arbeit, 1895
 3. Hab ich nur deine Liebe, 1901
 Zwei, 1896 
 Neue Fahrt, Berlin 1897
 Der Mann im Nebel, Hamburg 1899
 Mit dem Leben, Hamburg 1899
 Gustav Falke als Lyriker, Hamburg 1900
 Vogelbuch, Hamburg 1901 (together with Otto Speckter)
 Katzenbuch, Hamburg 1900 (together with Otto Speckter)
 Hohe Sommertage, Hamburg 1902
 Putzi, Hamburg 1902
 Aus Muckimacks Reich, Hamburg 1903
 Zwischengerichte, Leipzig 1903
 Der gestiefelte Kater, Hamburg 1904
 Ausgewählte Gedichte, Hamburg 1905
 Bübchens Weihnachtstraum. Melodramatisches Krippenspiel. Musik (1906): Engelbert Humperdinck. UA 1906
 Eichendorff, Berlin u.a. 1906
 En Handvull Appeln, Hamburg 1906
 Timm Kröger, Hamburg 1906
 Frohe Fracht, Hamburg 1907
 Heitere Geschichten, Berlin u.a. 1907
 Drei gute Kameraden, Mainz 1908
 Hamburg, Stuttgart u.a. 1908
 Die Kinder aus Ohlsens Gang, Hamburg 1908
 Dörten und andere Erzählungen, Leipzig 1909
 Ein lustig Jahr der Tiere, München 1909 (together with Th. Huggenberger)
 Tierbilder, Mainz (together with Eugen Osswald)
 1 (1909)
 2 (1909)
 Winter und Frühling, Leipzig 1909 
 Die Auswahl, Hamburg 1910  
 Geelgösch, Leipzig u.a. 1910
 Klaus Bärlappe, Mainz 1910
 Der Spanier, Berlin 1910
 Drei Helden, Mainz 1911 (together with Arpad Schmidhammer)
 Das Schützenfest. Im Fischerdorf, Reutlingen 1911
 Unruhig steht die Sehnsucht auf, Hamburg u.a.] 1911
 Gesammelte Dichtungen, Hamburg u.a.
 1. Herddämmerglück, 1912
 2. Tanz und Andacht, 1912
 3. Der Frühlingsreiter, 1912
 4. Der Schnitter, 1912
 5. Erzählende Dichtungen, 1912
 Herr Henning oder Die Tönniesfresser von Hildesheim, Leipzig 1912
 Die neidischen Schwestern, Berlin 1912
 Der Schnitter, Hamburg 1912
 Die Stadt mit den goldenen Türmen, Berlin 1912
 Anna, Hamburg 1913
 Herr Purtaller und seine Tochter, Mainz 1913
 Kunterbunt, Mainz 1914 (together with Eugen Osswald)
 Vaterland heilig Land, Leipzig 1915
 Viel Feind, viel Ehr, Leipzig 1915
 Das Leben lebt, Berlin 1916

Translations 
 Holger Drachmann: Verschrieben, Leipzig 1904 (translated together with Julia Koppel)
 John Brymer mit Zeichnungen von Stewart Orr: Zwei lustige Seeleute, Köln am Rhein 1905 Original: Two Merry Mariners

Editor 
 Steht auf ihr lieben Kinderlein, Köln 1906 (published together with Jakob Loewenberg)  
 Friedrich Hebbel: Meine Kindheit, Hamburg 1903
 Das Büchlein Immergrün, Cöln 1903
 Kriegsdichtungen, Hamburg
 1. Hoch, Kaiser und Reich!, 1914
 2. Unsere Helden, 1915
 3. Wir und Österreich, 1915
 4. Zu Wasser und zu Lande, 1915
 5. Feinde ringsum, 1915
 6. Von Feld zu Feld, 1915
 7. Fern vom Krieg, 1916
 8. Zum blutig frohen Reigen, 1917

Literature

German language 
 Oscar Ludwig Brandt: Gustav Falke. Enoch Verlag, Hamburg 1917.
 Friedrich Castelle: Gustav Falke. Ein deutscher Lyriker. Hesse und Becker, Leipzig 1909.
 Joachim Müller (ed.): Die Akten Gustav Falke und Max Dauthendey, Aufbau-Verlag, Berlin 1970 (Aus dem Archiv der Deutschen Schillerstiftung; 15/16)
 Kurt Oppert: Gustav Falke. Darstellung seiner Persönlichkeit und Formanalyse seiner Gedichte nach allgemeinen Gesichtspunkten und im Vergleich zu andersartiger Lyrik. Dissertation, Universität, Bonn 1925.
 Jens Resühr: Verskunstprobleme in der Lyrik Gustav Falkes. Hamburg 1967.
 Ernst Ludwig Schellenberg: Gustav Falke. Verlag für Literatur, Kunst und Musik, Leipzig 1908 (Beiträge zur Literaturgeschichte; H. 55)
 Heinrich Spiero: Gustav Falke. Ein Lebensbild. Westermann, Braunschweig 1928.
 Gerhard Steiner: Stille Dächer, zarte Liebe. Die Jugendzeit des Dichters Gustav Falke in Hildburghausen. Verlag Frankenschwelle Salier, Hildburghausen 1994, .

References

External links 

 
 
 
 

1853 births
1916 deaths
Writers from Lübeck
German poets
German male poets
German-language poets